Settlement Commission or Colonization Commission may refer to:

Royal Prussian Settlement Commission, in the provinces of Posen and West Prussia
Foreign Claims Settlement Commission, USA
Income Tax Settlement Commission, India
Tidelands Settlement Commission (see Bill Dodd)
Greek Refugee Settlement Commission (see Henry Morgenthau, Sr.)
Soldier Settlement Commission, Australia
South Australian Colonization Commission